Simon August Love Strand (born 25 May 1993) is a Swedish professional footballer who plays as a left-back or right-back for Hammarby in the Allsvenskan.

Early life
Strand was born and raised in Huddinge, part of the Stockholm urban area, and started to play football with local club Stuvsta IF. He later joined the youth academy of Djurgården. In 2010, Strand reached the final of P19 Allsvenskan with the club, but lost 0–1 to Malmö FF.

Club career

Years in Division 1
In 2012, Strand joined Väsby United in Division 1, Sweden's third tier. He made 25 league appearances for the side, scoring four goals, in his first season at senior level. At the end of the year, Strand was picked for the all-star game "Morgondagens Stjärnor" (English: "The Stars Of Tomorrow"), where two teams play against each other consisting of the best young players from the league.

In 2013, Strand signed a one-year contract with IK Frej in the same league, making 25 appearances. In 2014, he moved to Huddinge, a local rival of his youth club Stuvsta IF, playing 47 games across two seasons in Division 1.

Assyriska
On 8 February 2016, Strand signed a three-year contract with Assyriska FF in the Superettan, Sweden's second tier. He established himself as a starter and made 28 league appearances, but was unable to help his club avoid relegation after a 2–4 defeat on aggregate to Norrby IF in the playoffs. In early 2017, he reportedly attracted interest from several Superettan clubs, most notably IF Brommapojkarna, but eventually remained with Assyriska. He made 12 appearances for the club in Division 1 throughout the first half of the season, before leaving in July.

Öster and Lyngby
On 10 July 2017, Strand transferred to Öster in Superettan, signing a two and a half-year contract. He went on to make 14 appearances for the club, that finished 5th in the table despite being recently promoted, during the second half of the season.

On 4 January 2018, Strand transferred to Lyngby in the Danish Superliga, on a three-year deal. However, he left the club only about a month later, on 7 February, without making any competitive appearances. His contract was terminated by mutual consent, due to Lyngby's financial difficulties that resulted in player salaries being paid late.

Dalkurd
On 8 February 2018, Strand joined newly promoted Allsvenskan side Dalkurd on a free transfer, signing a three-year contract. He made 29 appearances for the club throughout the season, his first in Sweden's top tier, scoring once, although the side finished 15th in the table and suffered a relegation.

Elfsborg
On 25 February 2019, Strand transferred to Elfsborg in Allsvenskan, signing a three-year contract. He soon broke into the side as a starter, making 25 appearances in his debut season, and was voted Elfsborg Player of the Year by the supporters of the club.

In 2020, Strand made 24 appearances as Elfsborg finished 2nd in Allsvenskan, nine points behind Malmö. On 13 January 2021, he signed a new three-year contract with the club. The club finished 4th in the 2021 table, as Strand marked his 100th Allsvenskan appearance in a 3–0 away win against Djurgården on 18 October the same year.

After the 2022 season, in which he saw increased competition for playing time from both Oliver Zandén and Niklas Hult, Strand left Elfsborg. In total, he made 98 league appearances for the club across four seasons, scoring one goal.

Hammarby
On 7 March 2023, Strand transferred to Hammarby in Allsvenskan, signing a three-year contract.

International career
Strand was called up to the Sweden national team for the training tour in Portugal in early 2022, that later was cancelled due to the COVID-19 pandemic.

Career statistics

References

External links
 
 

1993 births
Living people
Swedish footballers
AFC Eskilstuna players
IK Frej players
Huddinge IF players
Assyriska FF players
Östers IF players
Lyngby Boldklub players
Dalkurd FF players
IF Elfsborg players
Hammarby Fotboll players
Allsvenskan players
Superettan players
Ettan Fotboll players
Association football defenders
Swedish expatriate footballers
Swedish expatriate sportspeople in Denmark
Expatriate men's footballers in Denmark